Alan Taimurazovich Kusov (born 11 August 1981) is a Russian former association football player.

Career
He made his Russian Premier League debut for FC Alania Vladikavkaz on 18 June 2000 in a game against FC Uralan Elista.

He played 5 seasons in the Russian Premier League, and also appeared in a Champions League qualifier for PFC CSKA Moscow.

He missed 2006 and 2007 seasons due to undisclosed injury. In the summer of 2008, he has been sold to Standard Baku from Azerbaijan.

On 2 September 2019, he was registered as a player for FC Spartak Vladikavkaz after a 5-year break from playing.

Personal life
His younger brother Artur Kusov also played professionally.

Honours 
 Russian Premier League winner: 2003.

International career 
Kusov made his debut for Russia on 13 February 2003 in a friendly against Romania. That was his only cap.

References 
  Profile
 

1981 births
Sportspeople from Vladikavkaz
Living people
Russian footballers
Russia under-21 international footballers
Russia international footballers
FC Spartak Vladikavkaz players
PFC CSKA Moscow players
Ossetian people
Expatriate footballers in Azerbaijan
Russian expatriate footballers
FC Anzhi Makhachkala players
Russian Premier League players
FC Torpedo Moscow players
FK Standard Sumgayit players
Russian expatriate sportspeople in Azerbaijan
FC Luch Vladivostok players
Expatriate footballers in Uzbekistan
FC Zvezda Irkutsk players
Association football midfielders
FC Olimp-Dolgoprudny players
FC Spartak Nizhny Novgorod players